LRH may refer to:

 L. Ron Hubbard, founder of Scientology
 La Rochelle - Île de Ré Airport, France, IATA code
 LRH-1, a protein that in humans is encoded by the NR5A2 gene.
 Lord Royal Highness, a character in SpongeBob SquarePants
 Luke Robert Hemmings